The Maldivian Medical Association was founded on 16 October 2005 in the Maldives as the first independent body representing Maldives medical doctors. It aims to improve medical services and to develop professionalism amongst Maldivian doctors. Its president is Ali Niyaf.

External links 
 

Organizations established in 2005
2005 establishments in the Maldives
Medical and health organisations based in the Maldives